Charles Salvatore Panozzo (born September 20, 1948) is an American musician best known as a co-founder of the rock band Styx. He is currently a part-time bass player in the band, sharing bass duties with Ricky Phillips. Panozzo is living with HIV, which played a role in limiting his full-time participation.

Biography
Panozzo grew up in a working-class Italian Catholic neighborhood on the south side of Chicago, Illinois.  At the age of 7, Panozzo and his fraternal twin brother, drummer John Panozzo, who died in July 1996, took music lessons from an uncle. He attended Catholic schools. Since age 7, Panozzo realized that he was gay.

In 1961-1962, Panozzo founded Styx with his brother, John and singer/keyboardist Dennis DeYoung. Panozzo received a degree in art education and taught art at the high school level.

In 1991, he was diagnosed as being HIV positive, which he kept secret along with his sexuality. In 2001, at the Human Rights Campaign annual dinner, in front of 1,000 guests, Panozzo announced that he is gay and is living with HIV. In 2007, he released his autobiography The Grand Illusion: Love, Lies, and My Life With Styx.

References

External links
 

1948 births
20th-century American guitarists
20th-century American LGBT people
21st-century American LGBT people
American gay musicians
American male bass guitarists
American people of Italian descent
American rock bass guitarists
Guitarists from Chicago
American LGBT singers
LGBT people from Illinois
Living people
People from Illinois
People with HIV/AIDS
Styx (band) members
American twins